The Laws of the State of Illinois are the official publication of the session laws of the Illinois General Assembly.

History 
Originally, the Illinois General Assembly met every two years, although special sessions were sometimes held, and the laws passed during a session were printed within a year of each session. Early volumes of Illinois laws contained public and private laws, as well as the auditors and treasurer's report for that biennium. Later, especially during and after the Civil War, public and private laws were printed in separate volumes.

See also 
 Illinois Compiled Statutes
 Law of Illinois
 United States Statutes at Large

References

External links 
 Public Acts of the Illinois General Assembly
 Laws of Illinois from Western Illinois University

Illinois law